Corporate Affairs Commission is a body of the Nigerian Government responsible for the regulation and management of companies in Nigeria. It was introduced in 1990 with the passing of the Companies and Allied Matters Act. It is headed by a chairman and closely assisted by the Registrar General/ CEO. The current chairman is Hon Ademola Seriki. Her headquarters is located in Plot 420, Tigris Crescent, Off Aguiyi Ironsi Street, Maitama, Abuja. Nigeria.

Other prominent offices of the board of CAC includes Manufacturer Association of Nigeria, Institute of Chartered Accountants of Nigeria (ICAN), Nigerian Bar Association, Securities and Exchange Commission, Federal Ministry of Trade and Investment, Nigerian Association of Chamber of Commerce, Industry, Mines and Agriculture, Federal Ministry of Justice and Federal Ministry of Finance. All these government agencies and parastatals send top representatives on the CAC board.

External links
Official Website
CAC Carrier Portal

References

Government of Nigeria
1990 establishments in Nigeria
Corporate governance